The Oxford History of Modern Europe is a series of books on the history of Modern Europe published by the Clarendon Press (an imprint of Oxford University Press) from 1954. The most recent volume appeared in 2022. The series was originally edited by Alan Bullock and F.W.D. Deakin and was intended to cover the period from the French Revolution to the Second World War.

Books
The series comprises a succession of self-contained monographs, usually addressing an individual country or theme. They are, in order of publication:

Reception
Writing in 2005, David Stevenson observed that the series "belongs to a more leisured era" and noted that no volumes were ever published which deal with Austria, Italy and Soviet Russia. Nonetheless, he observed that "the formula has generated a number of classics, which have remained in print for decades." A volume on Austria was, however, released in 2022.

See also
The New Cambridge Modern History (1957–1979)

References

Series of history books
Historiography of Europe
Clarendon Press books
1954 establishments in the United Kingdom